Vinohrady Cemetery is a large cemetery in Vinohrady in Prague 10 which contains Strašnice Crematorium. It is the second largest cemetery in Prague and is registered in the state list of cultural monuments. The remains of two Czech presidents are in this cemetery.

History
Over time the land has been extended three times. It ranks second by number of persons buried there. In terms of area, Ďáblice Cemetery is the largest in Prague.

In 1897 the municipal architect Antonín Turek designed the simple chapel here  which is near the entrance. This chapel is dedicated to St. Wenceslas and should not be confused with the more modern St. Wenceslas Church in nearby Vršovice. In front of this chapel are the graves of those who were killed in the Prague Uprising of May 1945 as well as a memorial to the children killed during the German occupation of Prague during the Second World War.

The Strašnice Crematorium opened in 1932.

Notable burials

Notable burials here include the novelist Jaroslav Foglar, the composer Julius Fučík, the sculptor Otto Gutfreund, President Emil Hácha, President Václav Havel's ashes, writers Jan Karafiát and Egon Kisch, the singer Laďka Kozderková, the painter Jakub Schikaneder, children's writer Karel Václav Rais, and historian and writer Zikmund Winter.

Former President Emil Hácha's burial was performed here under heavy security on 1 July 1945 when the Minister of the Interior, Václav Nosek, gave instructions that the grave was to remain unmarked. Nosek had arrested Hácha on 13 May 1945 because of his collaboration with the Nazis during the war. Hacha had become ill and died on 27 June at the prison hospital in Pankrác. Hácha's grave was unmarked for many years but there is now a large but simple gravestone.

Famous political dissident and the first president of the Czech Republic, Václav Havel, had his ashes buried here in the family vault joining his parents. Havel's first wife Olga Havlová was buried here in 1996. Havel was cremated at Strasnice Crematorium in a family ceremony; his state funeral at the cemetery was attended by several heads of state and followed by three days of national mourning.

Heritage
The cemetery and the crematorium are listed as a cultural monument of the Czech Republic. As part of the European Heritage Days initiative this cemetery was opened to the public in September 2012.

References

External links

 

19th-century establishments in Bohemia
1885 establishments in Austria-Hungary
Cemeteries in Prague
Prague 10
19th-century architecture in the Czech Republic